The voiced retroflex flap is a type of consonantal sound, used in some spoken languages.

Features
Features of the voiced retroflex flap:

Occurrence

See also
 Index of phonetics articles

Notes

References

External links
 

Retroflex consonants
Tap and flap consonants
Pulmonic consonants
Oral consonants
Central consonants